The third season of the reality television series Love & Hip Hop: New York aired on VH1 from January 7, 2013 until April 15, 2013. The show was primarily filmed in New York City, New York. It was executively produced by Mona Scott-Young for Monami Entertainment, Toby Barraud and Stefan Springman for NFGTV, and Shelly Tatro, Brad Abramson, Danielle Gelfand and Jeff Olde for VH1. 

The series chronicles the lives of several women and men in the New York area, involved in hip hop music. It consists of 14 episodes, including a two-part reunion special hosted by Mona Scott-Young.

Production
The show underwent major cast changes after last season's reunion special, in which all four original cast members accused their producers of manipulating storylines for drama. On September 7, 2012, VH1 announced that Chrissy Lampkin and Jim Jones would leave the show to star in their own spin-off show Chrissy & Mr. Jones, along with Emily Bustamante and Jim's mother Nancy Jones. Somaya Reece quit the show all together, while Olivia Longott's role would be diminished significantly, appearing only as a supporting cast member. 

On December 4, 2012, VH1 announced that Love & Hip Hop would be returning for a third season on January 7, 2013. Rich Dollaz and Yandy Smith were the only major cast members from the first two seasons to remain on the show, with Yandy taking over for Chrissy as the lead.  Erica Mena was promoted to the main cast, along with author and former hip hop groupie Winter Ramos, who had a brief guest appearance last season. They were joined by video vixen Tahiry Jose, radio personalities Raqi Thunda and Jen the Pen and celebrity stiletto expert Rashidah Ali. Joe Budden, Yandy's boyfriend Mendeecees Harris, Consequence and aspiring rapper Lore'l appeared as supporting cast members, with Joe's girlfriend Kaylin Garcia appearing in a minor supporting role. Former main cast member Kimbella Vanderhee returned as a guest star for two episodes. 

The season was released on DVD in region 1 on June 19, 2013.

Synopsis

Yandy has given birth to a baby boy with her boyfriend Mendeecees, and thinks it's about time he put a ring on it. Rapper Joe Budden struggles with substance abuse and feelings for his ex Tahiry. Erica mixes business with pleasure with her manager Rich as she embarks on a music career. Rapper Consequence and his long time girlfriend Jen the Pen clash over his Muslim faith and how to raise their son.

Reception
The cast retooling had a mixed reception from audiences with the season garnering the lowest ratings in the franchise's history at that point.

Cast

Starring

 Yandy Smith (13 episodes)
 Erica Mena (13 episodes)
 Jen the Pen (13 episodes)
 Raqi Thunda (13 episodes)
 Winter Ramos (7 episodes)
 Rashidah Ali (10 episodes)
 Tahiry Jose (14 episodes)

Also starring

 Joe Budden (13 episodes)
 Rich Dollaz (14 episodes)
 Mendeecees Harris (11 episodes)
 Olivia Longott (9 episodes)
 Consequence (13 episodes)
 Lore'l (10 episodes)
 Kaylin Garcia (9 episodes)

Kimbella Vanderhee returns in a guest role for two episodes. Joe's mother Fay Southerland, Cisco Rosado, Peter Gunz, Yandy's mother Laura Smith, Rich's mother Jewel Escobar and his ex-girlfriend Tiffany Lewis appear in several episodes as guest stars. The show also features minor appearances from notable figures within the hip hop industry and the cast's inner circle, including Ebro Darden, Vado, Yandy's cousin Maurice Talton and Angela Yee.

Episodes

Webisodes

Check Yourself
Love & Hip Hop New York: Check Yourself, which features the cast's reactions to each episode, was released weekly with every episode on digital platforms.

Bonus scenes
Deleted scenes from the season's episodes were released weekly as bonus content on VH1's official website.

Music
Several cast members had their music featured on the show and released singles to coincide with the airing of the episodes.

References

External links

2013 American television seasons
Love & Hip Hop